Rejected is an 1883 painting by the Australian artist Tom Roberts. The painting depicts an early self portrait of Tom Roberts.

The painting was featured in an episode of the BBC show Fake or Fortune?

References

Paintings by Tom Roberts
1883 paintings